"Your Number" is the eleventh Japanese single by South Korean boy group Shinee. The single was released on March 11, 2015 by Universal Music Japan sublabel EMI Records.

Background and release
This single comes in two versions. The limited edition comes with a bonus DVD containing the music video, a sketch of the music video's making, a photo card (1 out of 5 random cards) and a 16-page photo booklet. The regular edition comes with a photo card (1 out of 5 random cards). The music video teaser for "Your Number" was released through Universal Music Japan's YouTube channel on February 20, 2015 and the dance version of the music video was released on March 10, 2015.

Track listing

Chart performance

Oricon chart

References

Shinee songs
EMI Music Japan singles
2015 singles
J-pop songs
House music songs
Japanese-language songs
2015 songs
Songs written by Junji Ishiwatari